Robert Grantley Callender (born 2 November 1950) is a former cricketer. He represented Canada in the 1979 Cricket World Cup.  He appeared in two matches, taking a wicket against England but failed to score any runs.

External links
 

1950 births
Living people
Canadian cricketers
Canada One Day International cricketers
Cricketers at the 1979 Cricket World Cup
Barbadian cricketers
Barbadian emigrants to Canada